Ernst Cramer may refer to:

 Ernst Cramer (architect) (1898–1980), Swiss architect
 Ernst Cramer (journalist) (1913–2010), German journalist
 Ernst Cramer (politician) (born 1960), Dutch politician